The 1945 Jordanian  League (known as The Jordanian  League, was the second season of Jordan League. Al-Faisaly won its second title.

Overview
Al-Faysali won the championship.

References
RSSSF

External links
 Jordan Football Association website

Jordanian Pro League seasons
1945–46 in Asian association football leagues
1944–45 in Asian association football leagues
1945 in Transjordan